James Burton (November 6, 1963 –  January 5, 2015) was a professional ice hockey defenceman.

Awards
Burton was a three-time winner of the IHL's Governor's Trophy (Larry D. Gordon Trophy) which is awarded annually to the defenseman voted to be most outstanding based on performance over the course of the regular season by the league's coaches.

Coaching
Burton was a head coach in both the WPHL (with the Austin Ice Bats and Arkansas GlacierCats) and the ECHL (with the Augusta Lynx). Burton died of a heart attack on January 5, 2015.

Career statistics

References

External links

1963 births
2015 deaths
Austin Ice Bats players
Brantford Alexanders players
Canadian ice hockey defencemen
EHC Lustenau players
Fort Wayne Komets players
Hershey Bears players
Ice hockey people from Ontario
Ice hockey players at the 1994 Winter Olympics
EC KAC players
Olympic ice hockey players of Austria
Phoenix Roadrunners (IHL) players
Rochester Americans players
Sportspeople from Brantford
Canadian expatriate ice hockey players in Austria
Windsor Spitfires players